MV Damia Desgagnés is an asphalt-bitumen-chemical tanker owned and operated by Groupe Desgagnés for service on the Saint Lawrence Seaway. The ship was completed in March 2017. Damia Desgagnés is the first Canadian-flagged tanker to have a duel-fuel-powered propulsion system. The first of four ships of such a design, Damia Desgagnés ran aground on its first trip through the  Saint Lawrence Seaway.

Description
Damia Desgagnés is the first of four tankers designed specifically for Groupe Desgagnés to carry asphalt, bitumen and chemicals through the Saint Lawrence Seaway.

The ship is powered by a Wärtsilä 5RT-flex 50DF engine which can be powered by any of three types of fuel; heavy fuel oil, marine diesel oil or liquefied natural gas, marking Damia Desgagnés as the first Canadian-registered vessel to use this type of engine. The ship is also equipped with three auxiliary generators and one emergency generator. The ship's hull is of double hull design.

Service history
Damia Desgagnés was constructed at Beşiktaş Shipyard in Yalova, Turkey with the yard number 60. The ship was completed in March 2017 and accepted for delivery by the company on 30 March. The ship was named for Damien Beaulieu, the younger brother of the Chairman of the Board of Groupe Desgagnés, Louis-Marie Beaulieu. The vessel departed Turkey in April, taking on its first cargo in Europe before arriving in Canada in May. The ship's engines failed and Damia Desgagnés lost power and drifted on the river until the bow lodged in sand. No structural damage to the ship was recorded and no oil was spilled. However, all traffic on the Saint Lawrence Seaway was stopped as result of the grounding.

Citations

External links
 Video of the launch of Damia Desgagnés

2017 ships
Ships built in Yalova
Merchant ships of Canada
Maritime incidents in 2017
Groupe Desgagnés